Palmgren is a Swedish-language surname.

Geographical distribution
As of 2014, 59.1% of all known bearers of the surname Palmgren were residents of Sweden (frequency 1:4,096), 21.0% of the United States (1:423,011), 11.0% of Finland (1:12,325), 2.4% of Denmark (1:58,191) and 2.2% of Norway (1:57,779).

In Sweden, the frequency of the surname was higher than national average (1:4,096) in the following counties:
 1. Gotland County (1:1,671)
 2. Blekinge County (1:1,769)
 3. Östergötland County (1:2,074)
 4. Jönköping County (1:2,457)
 5. Kalmar County (1:2,542)
 6. Norrbotten County (1:3,059)
 7. Halland County (1:3,360)
 8. Södermanland County (1:3,723)
 9. Stockholm County (1:3,777)

In Finland, the frequency of the surname was higher than national average (1:12,325) in the following regions:
 1. Uusimaa (1:6,016)
 2. Central Ostrobothnia (1:6,687)
 3. Lapland (1:7,220)
 4. Åland (1:10,764)
 5. Kymenlaakso (1:12,207)

People
 Alvar Palmgren (1880–1960), Finnish botanist
 Aurore Palmgren (1880–1961), Swedish film actress
 Axel Palmgren (1867–1939), Finnish lawyer and politician
 Eric Palmgren (1916–2015), Finnish Olympic sailor
 Maikki Järnefelt-Palmgren (1871–1929), Finnish opera singer
 Maria Jonae Palmgren (1630–1708), Swedish scholar
 Niclas Palmgren (born 1970), Swedish politician
 Raoul Palmgren (1912–1995), Finnish writer
 Roger Palmgren, Swedish football manager
 Selim Gustaf Adolf Palmgren (1878–1951), Finnish composer, pianist, and conductor
 Valfrid Palmgren (1877–1967), Swedish politician; one of the first female members of the Stockholm City Council and a reformer of the public libraries.

Palmgreen 
 Karl Palmgreen

References

Swedish-language surnames